Justice for Annie: A Moment of Truth Movie is a 1996 American-Canadian made-for-television drama film directed by Noel Nosseck. The film, based on actual events, is a part of the Moment of Truth franchise and was also made as Death Benefit (1996). Filming took place in Toronto.

Plot
Carol Mills (Peggy Lipton) is a mother who has a troubling relationship with her 19-year-old daughter Annie (Danica McKellar). Unable to live with her any longer, Annie moves out and marries her boyfriend Ken Carman (Martin Cummins). It soon turns out their marriage is a failure, and she decides to move in with another family, George and Helen Preston (Terry David Mulligan, Susan Ruttan). Not much later, Carol receives a message, informing her that her daughter accidentally died. Crushed, she learns at the funeral that Annie had a life insurance policy worth of $100,000, with Helen as beneficiary. She starts to suspect that Annie was actually murdered because of that and tries to collect evidence, with the help of a detective (Bruce Weitz).

The film was based on the case of Deana Hubbard Wild, who was pushed to her death from a cliff near Monterey, California. Wild's boyfriend's mother was convicted of her murder in 1992. His father was also charged, but died before the case was brought to trial.

Cast
Peggy Lipton as Carol Mills
Danica McKellar as Annie Mills Carman
Terry David Mulligan as George Preston
Gwynyth Walsh as Lydia Sawyer
Teryl Rothery as Laura Kane
Lochlyn Munro as Mickey Holloway
Martin Cummins as Ken Carman
Bruce Weitz as Detective McAdams
Susan Ruttan as Helen Preston

References

External links

1996 television films
1996 films
NBC network original films
American films based on actual events
1996 drama films
1990s English-language films
Films directed by Noel Nosseck